Rouge is the self-titled debut studio album by Brazilian pop girl group Rouge, released on  by Columbia Records in featuring with Sony BMG. Recorded during the show Popstars with the music production of Rick Bonadio, who signs 9 of the 14 compositions, the album counts on compositions of Milton Guedes, Dudu Falcão, Piska, besides having nine versions of international songs and the participation of trio KLB in one of the tracks. The album mixes hectic songs from pop and dance-pop, in songs that talk about fame, love, domination and the power of dreams.

It features the singles: "Não Dá pra Resistir", first single released after the victory of the group in the program Popstars ; "Ragatanga" a cover of Las Ketchup, song that became a fever in 2002, boosted sales of the album and the group's career, winning the audience with their unusual lyrics and dancing and reaching the top of the charts, staying for eleven weeks in the lead, and "Beijo Molhado", single released on the radio to finalize the promotion of the album.

The album was a resounding commercial success on Brazil's top-selling album charts, peaking at the top of the charts top-selling for while the at the top of the list for ten full weeks in the same week that "Ragatanga" topped the hit chart for the entire nine-week. Rouge was certified 2× Platinum by the Pro-Música Brasil, and has sold over 1.2 million copies. To promote the album, the group embarked on the Popstar Tour, as well as having recorded the DVD O Sonho de Ser Uma Popstar and participating in various TV shows.

Background
On March 1, 2002, SBT announced that they were looking for girls between the ages of 18 and 25, who could sing and dance for a chance to become a "popstar", the name of the reality show. Professionals in the music industry would choose the best candidates in several stages, going through a rigorous selection to form a pop girl group. The show Popstars, a co-production of SBT and RGB in partnership with Sony Music, received 30,000 entries from girls aged 18 to 25 from all over Brazil. In the first round, 6,000 girls were chosen, and on the second round, they were cut down to 2,000.

Popstars had 20 episodes. They were broadcast every Saturday on SBT, and during the week, a one-minute newsletter was displayed at the same time as the weekly attraction at 7:45 p.m. Sony Music was responsible for the release of the album, music video and concerts. The panel was formed by the producer Liminha, vice president of marketing of Sony Music in Brazil, Alexandre Schiavo, music producer Rick Bonadio, singer Iara Negrete and choreographer Ivan Santos. When they were down to 20 candidates, the girls had to learn the debut single of the group, "Não Dá pra Resistir". The 20 candidates also had to divide into groups to perform the song. In the group "Barish Bashan" were Karin Hils and Fantine Thó, whereas in the group "Ethnic" were Patrícia Lissa, Luciana Andrade and Aline Wirley. The first members of the group were Karin and Patricia, being the first to be called. Soon after, Fantine, Luciana and Aline were also summoned, thus forming the group "Rouge", name chosen by the members themselves, who among some options given, found that in addition to having five members and also because in French it means red, it is associated color to sensuality ... and it's pop! ".

Recording and Songs
Amid the eliminations and tests to continue in the program, the group's first album, which had no name yet, was already being recorded. The song "Nunca Deixa de Sonhar" was recorded by the trio KLB with the aim of showing that everyone should go after their dreams. Thus, Kiko told that the girls would record the song with them and that the song would be part of the first disc of the "PopStars". The album counts with fourteen tracks, being 9 versions of international songs, and the other 5 compositions of Rick Bonadio, in partnership with other composers. Bonadio emphasized the participation of the Popstars in the vocal arrangements, saying: "They contributed a lot, choosing who would sing what." Liminha went to a meeting with Sony representatives from around the world and commented that she needed a repertoire for a group that would launch in Brazil, receiving from Spain the song "Ragatanga", sung by a group called Las Ketchup. From there, Bonadio made a version and turned it into Ragatanga, a key hit that says unrelated words adopted by children. "The secret of a good version is to have fidelity to the original, not to try to invent," Minister Bonadio.

But the music that drove their success to heights, however, almost did not come on the album. "The list of songs was ready when I heard about 'Ragatanga,'" Schiavo said. The chorus of the song, "Aserehe ra de re De hebe tu de hebere seibiunouba mahabi" does not mean anything. that the people who do not know English usually sing "Thing that the adolescents of the Ketchup invented", it counts.The Brazilian version has a mixture of Spanish and Portuguese. The song "Não Dá Pra Resistir" is a version of Milton Guedes for the song "Irresistible" by Frederik Thomander and sung by Nikki Cleary. The album also brings other romantic ballads full of lyrics talking about youthful passions.

Release and promotion
After the recording of the album, the girls faced a marathon, participating in the show Domingo Legal  of Gugu Liberato, on Sunday, August 18, releasing the album on Monday, August 19. On the same day of the release of the album, the girls were presented to the press, having the debut music video of the group, of the song "Não Dá pra Resistir", was exhibited for the debut time. The album, also was released in Argentina, Chile and Peru. In the show on August 31, the girls were shown recording the song "Ragatanga", as well as showing the girls making their first pocket show at the Parque Dom Pedro Shopping in Campinas, São Paulo, bringing together 10,000 people. On August 31, they performed the first live performance, in Via Funchal, one of the biggest concert halls in São Paulo. "Hoje Eu Sei", was inserted as a soundtrack to SBT's soap opera Jamais Te Esquecerei (2003) and was later included in the album Mil e Uma Noites (2005). The "Não Dá Pra Resistir" Music was the subject of SBT's soap opera Pequena Travessa.

Singles
During the preparation of the group on the show Popstars, Sony Music's intention was to release the song "Não Dá pra Resistir" as the debut single. In the show of July 6, 2002, the 24 candidates received the song for rehearsal. On August 19, the group performed for the debut time with the "No Dá pra Resistir" music video, and the next day the song was sent to the radio as the album's lead single. According to Sony Music, the intention was to make the song reach the top of the charts. The song became a hit in Brazil, reaching also figure in the Argentina charts, reaching the position number 10. On August 22, "Nunca Deixe de Sonhar" was released as single, bringing the participation of the boy group KLB. The band was composed by the brothers especially for the girl group and served to boost their live album, KLB: Ao Vivo (2002). The third single from the album, "Ragatanga". Due to the success of its Spanish version made by the girl group Las Ketchup, the label saw in "Ragatanga" a hit, and released quickly, and that according to the wording of the Folha de Londrina; "she practically ran over the song "Não Dá pra Resistir", which was meant to be the group's hit." The song became not only the biggest hit of the album, but the band's biggest hit, reaching and remaining at number one on the radio for 11 weeks. Months after "Ragatanga" lose strength on the radio, The fourth and final single from Rouge, the song "Beijo Molhado", released as a single summer on 19 January 2003. In February, the song reached the fourth position in the ranking of the most played songs in Brazil. Due to the recording of the second album and the Sony Music's quick decision to focus on new songs, the song did not get a music video, and no next single was released from the album.

Commercial performance 
The album came out with an initial draft of 150,000 copies. According to the record company Sony Music, in less than three months the album had already sold more than 700 thousand copies, made rare in the time of the piracy, thanks to the success of Ragatanga. In 2002, the album received the certification of double platinum (for selling more than 750 thousand copies) by the Associação Brasileira dos Produtores de Discos. The whole album sold 1.2 million copies.

Track listing

Charts

Weekly charts

Year-end charts

Certifications

See also
List of best-selling girl groups
List of best-selling girl groups#Best-selling girl group albums

Notes

Rouge (group) albums
2002 debut albums
Albums produced by Rick Bonadio